Cronies is a 2015 American comedy-drama film written by, directed by and starring Michael Larnell.  Spike Lee served as an executive producer of the film.

Cast
George Sample III as Louis
Zurich Buckner as Jack
Brian Kowalski as Andrew
Landra Taylor as Nikki
Samiyah Womack as Aisha
Elinor Nelson as Juanita
Homer Simmons as Suede
Michael Larnell as Interviewer / Radio Host

Reception
The film has a 67% rating on Rotten Tomatoes.

References

External links
 
 

American comedy-drama films
2015 comedy-drama films
2015 directorial debut films
2015 films
40 Acres and a Mule Filmworks films
2010s English-language films
2010s American films